Kansas is an unincorporated community in Graves County, in the U.S. state of Kentucky.

History
A post office called Kansas was established in 1854, and remained in operation until 1910. The community was named after the Kansas Territory.

References

Unincorporated communities in Graves County, Kentucky
Unincorporated communities in Kentucky